Shikali Jatra is a religious festival of Newar people in Khokana of the Kathmandu Valley. The jatra is performed in Dashain by the people who do not celebrate the Dashain festival.

The Jatra is five days long and is dedicated to the goddess Shikali (also called Ajima). The goddess Shikali is one of the sisters of goddess in Dakshinkali. The Shikali's temple is located in Khokana.

In Khokana there are three major communities namely Tagu, Salagu and Jagu. On the day of Jatra, four virgin boys from Tagu and Salagu is selected to worship Shikali. The locals wears masks to represent 14 Hindu gods and goddesses. Masked dances is performed following tantric rituals. The dancers wears colourful attires. A wooden chariot of goddess Rudrayani is carried on the streets and finally set at the Shikali temple. The procession is led by a Newar priest wearing white robe.

References

Festivals in Nepal